Tommy The Little Dragon is a Russian educational animated film for preschool children, created in 2017 by ToyRoy This is the only animated series created on private capital in Russia.

At the moment, 2 seasons and 52 episodes have already been released. In the fall of 2020, the third season of the animated series is scheduled to be released, with 16 episodes. Also in the same year, the animated series Tommy The Little Dragon was released on Amazon Prime in the United States and Canada and will be released on other streaming platforms in Taiwan, India, China and Pakistan.

The script for the third season of the animated series Tommy The Little Dragon was developed by the author of the script for the cartoons Teenage Mutant Ninja Turtles and Disney's Adventures of the Gummi Bears, Michael Maurer.

Description 
Tommy the Little Dragon is an animated TV series for children from 2 to 4 years old. The length of each episode, 5 min 30 sec, has been chosen so that the parents can stop a child's viewing at any time without any stress. There is no offense or antagonists in the series's world, so parents can safely leave their children in front of the TV and be sure that Tommy the Little Dragon will teach only good things. The series aims to convey a message about the importance of the family values, love for our close people, caring about the young ones and helping the grown-ups and seniors. Each episode is based on a common situation, which children know quite well, so that they can review this situation from a different point of view and find a solution in an easy and playful way.

Creators 
 Director: Andrei Bakhurin
 Screenwriter: Inga Kirkiz
 Artists: Anna Umanets, Elena Bryutten-Firsova
 Animators: K. Muravei, M. Kolpakova, Kirill Vorontsov, E. Sedova, Yu. Kutyumov, E. Demenkova, Anelya Gusha, M. Chugunova, Vadim Merkulov, M. Isakova, V. Vasyukhichev, Alla Yaroshenko, A. Oginskaya, D Kravchenko, G. Demin,  T. Tishenina, Yulia Lis, A. Ivanova, M. Belyaev, Oleg Sheplyakov
 Producers: L. Vavilova, O. Roy, Samson Polyakov, D. Davydova
 Composer: Alexander Para
 Sound engineers: Igor Yakovel, Denis Dushin
 Roles voiced: Andrey Levin, Julia Rudina

 English Roles voiced by Lauren Robinson, Roger King and George Robinson
 Produced by George Robinson. Robinson Creative for Toy Roy

Episodes 
1. The Case of the Missing Monster
2. My New Pacifier 
3. The Angry Trains 
4. At the Pond 
5. Pirates
6. Meet Bustler and Patlience 
7. The Land of Wasteland
8. Good Mood
9. A Forbidden Word
10. A Endless Birthday 
11. A Bedtime Story
12. Giant Mandy
13. Sumo Challenge
14. Roll the Dice!
15. For Everlasting Candies
16. Marquise Caprice
17. Imagine That!
18. Draw the World
19. Scribbles the Cat
20. I Can Do It!
21. Empathy
22. Ice Cream, Pacifiers and Teddy Bears
23. Nature is Beautiful
24. Sand Castles 
25. The 4 Seasons
26. Silly Monitors

Recognition 

Tommy The Little Dragon occupies the top lines of the ratings of the most popular and popular animated series in Russian online cinemas ivi.ru, Okko, Megogo, Wink, Tvzavr. The animated series is also popular on the main children's TV channels Carousel, Mama, MULT, and, in addition, is the owner of the silver button on YouTube Russia for quickly reaching the audience. To date, its total number per month on YouTube is more than 20 million.

Awards and festivals 

Awards

 2018 – Open Russian Animated Film Festival in Suzdal: the animated series  “Shkola zaboty (Drakosha Tosha)”.

 Festivals 

 2018 – SUPERTOON – Brač, Croatia;
 2018 – Constantine's Golden Coin – Niš, Serbia;
 2018 – San Diego International Kids' Film Festival – San Diego, United States;
 2018 – FAN CHILE, Festival Audiovisual para Niños – Santiago, Chile;
 2018 – Biennial of Animation Bratislava – Bratislava, Slovakia;
 2018 – Cinekid – Amsterdam, Netherlands;
 2019 – Tehran International Animation Festival – Tehran, Iran;
 2019 – Golden Kuker – Sofia, Bulgaria.

References

Links 
 “Shkola zaboty (Drakosha Tosha)” on Animator.ru
 

2010s animated television series
2017 Russian television series debuts
Animated preschool education television series
2010s preschool education television series
2020s preschool education television series
Russian animated television series
Animated television series about dragons